Camillo Procaccini (3 March 1561 at Parma – 21 August 1629) was an Italian painter. He has been posthumously referred to as the Vasari of Lombardy, for his prolific Mannerist fresco decoration.

Born in Bologna, he was the son of the painter Ercole Procaccini the Elder, and older brother to Giulio Cesare and Carlo Antonio, both painters.

Works
In 1587 he distinguished in the fresco decoration of the Basilica della Ghiara in Reggio Emilia. In the late 1580s he moved to Milan, where count Camillo Visconti Borromeo commissioned him the decoration of his villa in Lainate. The organ shutters for the Cathedral of Milan were painted after 1590 by Camillo, Giuseppe Meda (died 1599), and Ambrogio Figino. He painted the frescoes of the nave and the apse of the Cathedral of Piacenza in collaboration with Ludovico Carracci (1605–1609), and the vault and choir in San Barnaba of Milan. He painted a Nativity in the Sacro Monte d'Orta.

He is known for a Martyrdom of St. Agnes painted in fresco in the sacristy of the Milan cathedral; a Madonna and Child painted for the church of Santa Maria del Carmine; an 'Adoration of the Shepherds found in the Brera; and the ceiling of the church of Padri Zoccolanti, representing the Assumption of the Virgin. He painted an altarpiece with the Annunciation for the Certosa di Pavia and two canvases with Mary sister of Moses who rejoices after the passage of the Red Sea and Rebecca who quenches the thirst of Abraham's servant from the cycle of heroines of the Bible (1620-23) for the church of Santa Maria di Canepanova in Pavia. He frescoed a large Last Judgment in the apse of the church of San Prospero at Reggio. He painted a St. Roch administering the Sacrament to the Plague-stricken. At Santa Maria del Suffragio, Piacenza he painted Immaculate Conception with Saints Francis and Anthony.

Among his pupils was the painter Giovanni Battista Discepoli. Another pupil was Lorenzo Franchi (c. 1563 - c. 1630).

References

1551 births
1629 deaths
16th-century Italian painters
Italian male painters
17th-century Italian painters
Painters from Milan
Painters from Bologna
Italian Mannerist painters
Fresco painters